27 Regiment RLC is a regiment of the Royal Logistic Corps of the British Army.

History
27 Transport Regiment, of the newly formed Royal Corps of Transport, was formed in 1965 as a maritime transport squadron. Upon the creation of the Royal Logistic Corps in 1993, 27 Transport Regiment was transferred without a change in title.

Structure
The regiment's current structure is:
77 Headquarters Squadron
8 Fuel and General Transport Squadron
19 Tank Transporter Squadron
91 Supply Squadron

References

Regiments of the Royal Logistic Corps
Military units and formations established in 1965